Events from the year 1916 in Ireland.

Events
14 February – John Redmond is re-elected Chairman of the Irish Parliamentary Party in Dublin.
29 February – the week-long Derry Feis opens in the city.
 21 March – a crowd attacks Sinn Féin's Tullamore headquarters; three police are injured.
21 April – Roger Casement and two others are arrested at Banna Strand, County Kerry, for attempting to land arms and ammunition.
22 April – Eoin MacNeill, Chief of Staff of the Irish Volunteers cancels all manoeuvres of Volunteers planned for the following day.
23 April – Easter Sunday: the military council of the Irish Republican Brotherhood meets at Liberty Hall and decides to begin the planned insurrection at noon the next day. The Proclamation of the Republic is signed by the seven leaders in the name of the Provisional Government of the Irish Republic. Volunteers from Belfast and County Cork begin manoeuvres but return home.

24 April – the Easter Rising begins in Dublin. The Irish Volunteers and the Irish Citizen Army occupy the General Post Office, City Hall, the College of Surgeons, the Four Courts, Jacob's Factory, Boland's Mills, the South Dublin Union, and the Mendicity Institution. At noon Patrick Pearse reads the proclamation outside the General Post Office, Dublin. Liam Mellows leads a rising of Volunteers in County Galway.
25 April – martial law is declared in Dublin by the British authorities for a period of one month.
26 April
Francis Sheehy-Skeffington, Thomas Dickson and Patrick McIntyre are summarily executed at Portobello Barracks.
Dublin-built HMS Helga shells Liberty Hall from the Liffey.
Battle of Mount Street Bridge
27 April
 Major-General Sir John Maxwell arrives in Dublin to take command of the British Army, 12,000 of whose troops are now in the city; the centre is cordoned off.
 Gas attack at Hulluch in France: The 47th Brigade, 16th (Irish) Division is decimated in one of the most heavily concentrated German gas attacks of World War I.
 Newspaper strike in Dublin – until 5 May. 
28 April – Battle of Ashbourne: A group of Volunteers at Ashbourne, County Meath, force the Royal Irish Constabulary to surrender with the loss of 8 police to 2 Volunteers.
29 April – at 3.45pm, Patrick Pearse, James Connolly and Thomas MacDonagh surrender unconditionally as the Easter Rising collapses.
1 May – the Easter Rising collapses. Sir John Maxwell, Commander-in-Chief of the British forces announces that all involved in the insurrection have surrendered.
3 May – following their courts martial, Patrick Pearse, Thomas MacDonagh and Thomas J. Clarke are executed at Kilmainham Gaol.
4 May – the executions continue. Joseph Plunkett, Michael O'Hanrahan, Edward Daly and Willie Pearse are executed for their part in the Rising. The Chief Secretary of Ireland, Augustine Birrell, resigns.
5 May – John MacBride, another leader of the Rising, is executed today. W. T. Cosgrave is sentenced to death, however, this is later commuted to penal servitude for life.
8 May – another four leaders of the Easter Rising are executed. They are Éamonn Ceannt, Conn Colbert, Michael Mallin and Seán Heuston.
11 May – during a debate in the Parliament of the United Kingdom on the Irish crisis, John Dillon of the Irish Parliamentary Party calls on the British government to end the executions of the Easter Rising leaders.
12 May – two more leaders, Seán Mac Diarmada and James Connolly are executed. Connolly, who was wounded in the fighting, is strapped to a chair and shot. Meanwhile, Prime Minister H. H. Asquith arrives in Dublin for a week-long visit.
15 May – the trial of Roger Casement begins in London. He is charged with high treason for his part in the Easter Rising.

17 May – Thomas O'Dwyer, Roman Catholic Bishop of Limerick, refuses a request to discipline two of his curates who expressed republican sympathies. He reminds General Maxwell that he had shown no mercy to those who surrendered.
21 May – daylight saving time begins for the first time throughout the United Kingdom as people put their clocks forward one hour. The purpose is to reduce the number of evening hours to save fuel.
26 June – Roger Casement goes on trial at the Royal Courts of Justice on a charge of treason. He has been stripped of his knighthood.
1 July – the Battle of the Somme begins. The 36th Ulster Division, which contains many Ulster Volunteers, loses 5,500 men in the first two days.
23 July – thousands attend an open-air meeting at the Phoenix Park in Dublin to discuss the British government's Irish partition proposals. It is the first open-air meeting since martial law was proclaimed.
26 July – the date of 3 August is set as the execution date of Roger Casement.
3 August – Roger Casement is hanged at Pentonville Prison for high treason.
19 August – The Irish Times in Dublin issues a 264-page handbook detailing the events of the Easter Rising; a 2nd edition is published by the end of the year.
1 October – time in Ireland: Dublin Mean Time (25 minutes behind Greenwich Mean Time) is made the same as British time from 2:00 am today under terms of the Time (Ireland) Act, 1916.
29 October – John Redmond demands the abolition of martial law, the release of suspected persons, and that Irish prisoners be treated as political prisoners.
3 November – railway steamer  and coalship SS Retriever collide and sink in Carlingford Lough, County Down, with the loss of 94 lives.
5 November – Honan Chapel, Cork, a product of the Irish Arts and Crafts movement, is dedicated.
18 November – Battle of the Somme ends after 141 days; stopped by foul weather and with thousands of Irish casualties.
21 December – in the British House of Commons, it is announced that all Irish prisoners are to be released.
25 December – the last group of Irish prisoners, 460 men from Reading Gaol, arrive in Dublin. Seán T. O'Kelly and Arthur Griffith are among those released.

Arts and literature
 2 April – W. B. Yeats's play At the Hawk's Well is first performed, privately in London.
 7 August – there is a large audience at the Bohemian Theatre in Dublin for the first screening of the Film Company of Ireland's first film O'Neill of the Glen.
 September – W. B. Yeats' poem Easter 1916 is written.
 13 December – Lennox Robinson's play The Whiteheaded Boy is premiered at the Abbey Theatre, Dublin.
 29 December – James Joyce's semi-autobiographical novel A Portrait of the Artist as a Young Man is first published complete in book form in New York.
 Daniel Corkery's short stories A Munster Twilight are published.
 George Noble Plunkett is dismissed from his post as curator of the National Museum of Ireland and deported to Oxford.

Sport

Soccer
Irish League
Winners: Linfield
Irish Cup
Winners: Linfield 1–1, 1–0 Glentoran

Gaelic Games
Senior Football Championship
Winners: Wexford
Wexford 3–4 : 1–2 Mayo
Senior Hurling Championship
Winners: Tipperary
Tipperary (Boherlahan) 5–4 : 3–2 Kilkenny (Tullaroan)

Births
19 March – James Jackman, recipient of the Victoria Cross for gallantry at Tobruk, Libya, the day before his death (killed in action 1941).
19 March – Peter Kavanagh, writer, scholar and publisher (died 2006).
13 April – Ralph Cusack, English High Court judge (died 1978 in England).
20 April – Gerard Dillon, painter (died 1971).
20 May – Francis Blackwood, 10th Baron Dufferin and Claneboye (died 1991).
21 May – Sam Thompson, playwright (died 1965).
30 May – Jackie Power, Limerick hurler and Gaelic footballer (died 1994).
6 July – Hugh Gibbons, Roscommon Gaelic footballer and Fianna Fáil TD (died 2007).
23 July – Tom O'Higgins, barrister and judge, Irish Chief Justice, Fine Gael TD and twice defeated Irish presidential candidate (died 2003).
31 July – Brian Inglis, journalist, historian and television presenter (died 1993).
14 August – Máirín Lynch, wife of Taoiseach Jack Lynch (died 2004).
4 September – Alexis FitzGerald Snr, solicitor, Fine Gael Seanad member (died 1985).
8 September – John M. Feehan, author and publisher (died 1991).
24 September – Robin Kinahan, Unionist politician and businessman (died 1997).
3 October – Frank Pantridge, physician, cardiologist and inventor of the portable defibrillator (died 2004).
17 October – Jack Bowden, cricketer and hockey player (died 1988).
27 October – Nigel Trench, 7th Baron Ashtown, peer and diplomat (died 2010).
3 November – Rúaidhrí de Valera, archaeologist (died 1978).
10 November – Louis le Brocquy, artist (died 2012).
25 November – Cosmo Haskard, British Army officer, Governor of the Falkland Islands (died 2017).
8 December – T. K. Whitaker, civil servant, economist (died 2017).
14 December – Tomás de Bhaldraithe, Irish language scholar and lexicographer (died 1996).
16 December – Michael Carty, Fianna Fáil TD (died 1975).
21 December – Seán Brosnan, barrister, Fianna Fáil TD and Senator (died 1979).
25 December – Noel Larmour, cricketer and diplomat (died 1999).
Paddy Fahey, fiddler (died 2019)

Deaths
9 January – Ada Rehan, actress in the United States (born c.1857).
16 February – Adelaide Maria Guinness, wife of Edward Guinness, 1st Earl of Iveagh, first owner of Farmleigh.
18 March – Stopford Augustus Brooke, Anglican clergyman and writer (born 1832).
26 April
Francis Browning, cricketer (born 1868).
Francis Sheehy-Skeffington, suffragist, pacifist and writer, murdered by British Army (born 1878).
29 April – The O'Rahilly, killed during the Easter Rising (born 1875).
3 May
Tom Clarke, nationalist, rebel and organiser of the Easter Rising, executed (born 1857).
Thomas MacDonagh, nationalist, poet, rebel and an Easter Rising leader, executed (born 1878).
Patrick Pearse, teacher, barrister, poet, writer, nationalist and political activist, an Easter Rising leader, executed (born 1879).
4 May
Edward Daly, Easter Rising participant, executed by firing squad (born 1891).
Willie Pearse, Easter Rising participant, executed, brother of Patrick Pearse (born 1891).
Joseph Plunkett, nationalist, poet, journalist and an Easter Rising leader, executed (born 1887).
5 May – John MacBride, nationalist, rebel and an Easter Rising leader, executed (born 1865).
8 May
Éamonn Ceannt, nationalist, rebel and an Easter Rising leader, executed (born 1881).
Conn Colbert, nationalist and rebel, Easter Rising participant, executed (born 1888).
Seán Heuston, Fianna Éireann member, Easter Rising participant, executed by firing squad in Kilmainham Gaol (born 1891).
Michael Mallin, second in command of Irish Citizen Army, Easter Rising participant, executed by firing squad in Kilmainham Gaol (born 1874).
9 May – Thomas Kent, nationalist and rebel, executed following a gunfight with the RIC (born 1865).
12 May
James Connolly, socialist, trade unionist, nationalist, rebel and an Easter Rising leader, executed (born 1868).
Seán Mac Diarmada, nationalist, rebel and an Easter Rising leader, executed (born 1883).
5 June – Herbert Kitchener, 1st Earl Kitchener, British Field Marshal and statesman (born 1850).
1 July – William Crozier, cricketer (born 1873).
23 July – Thomas MacDonald Patterson, politician and newspaper publisher in the United States (born 1839).
3 August – Roger Casement, British diplomat, nationalist, poet and Irish revolutionary, executed at Pentonville Prison (born 1864).
25 August – Maurice O'Rorke, politician and Speaker of the New Zealand House of Representatives (born 1830).
9 September – Thomas Kettle, writer, barrister, Nationalist politician and economist, killed in action (born 1880).
19 October – Alexander Young, soldier, recipient of the Victoria Cross for gallantry in 1901 at Ruiterskraal, South Africa, killed in action (born 1873).
25 October – John Todhunter, poet and playwright (born 1839).
2 November – Frank Hugh O'Donnell, writer and nationalist politician (born 1846).
18 December – Henry Mitchell Jones, recipient of the Victoria Cross for gallantry in 1855 at Sebastopol, Crimea (born 1831).
22 December – James O'Kelly, nationalist politician and journalist, Irish Parliamentary Party MP (born 1845).

References

 
1910s in Ireland
Ireland
Years of the 20th century in Ireland
Ireland